Bai Suzhen, also known as Lady Bai, is a mythological figure in Chinese folk religion. She is a one-thousand-year-old white snake spirit and the title character of the Legend of the White Snake, one of China's "four great folktales". The legend has been adapted into several Chinese operas, films, television series and other media. In some versions of the legend, Bai Suzhen becomes a goddess; her worshippers refer to her as Madam White Snake.

Legend

After one thousand years of disciplined training in Taoism on Mount Emei, the white snake, Bai Suzhen, is transformed into a woman by the essence of the Dragon King of the East China Sea. She decides to go out into the human world and do good deeds in order to become immortal. She is later accepted by the goddess Lishan Laomu as a disciple.

On a visit to West Lake, she falls in love with a young man named Xu Xian and soon becomes his wife. Eventually, however, a Buddhist monk, Abbot Fahai, discovers her true origin and compels her to fight for both her marriage and her freedom. At last he tracks down the couple, defeats Bai Suzhen and imprisons her in the imposing Leifeng Pagoda. She is finally freed from the pagoda when her son's filial piety moves Heaven.

In some versions, after her imprisonment she is transformed into the goddess Yaotai Laomu's mount. She goes on to accompany Yaotai Laomu for many years as they attempt to help all living beings and save the world.

Worship
Bai Suzhen is worshipped as a deity in Chinese folk religion, where she is known as Madam White Snake. It is said that she and Xu Xian once practiced Chinese medicine and that believers came to them seeking healing and health advice. The temple inaugurated the annual Dragon Boat Festival to celebrate the birthday of Madam White Snake, and it has become a traditional and popular event.

Influence

Gallery

References 

Legend of the White Snake characters
Chinese goddesses
Deities in Taoism
Snake goddesses